Tern Hill railway station was a station in Ternhill, Shropshire, England. The station was opened in 1867 and closed in 1963. The station had a pagoda shelter, adjacent to the booking office.

References

Further reading

Disused railway stations in Shropshire
Railway stations in Great Britain opened in 1867
Railway stations in Great Britain closed in 1963
Former Great Western Railway stations